Seán Linnane (born 26 January  1996) is an Irish hurler who plays as a right wing-forward for club side Turloughmore and at inter-county level with the Galway senior hurling team.

Early life

Linnane was born in Turloughmore, County Galway. His father, Gerry, played for Galway while his uncle, Sylvie, won All-Ireland medals with Galway in 1987 and 1988.

Playing career

Mary Immaculate College

During his studies at Mary Immaculate College, Linnane was selected for the college's senior hurling team. On 27 February 2016, he won a Fitzgibbon Cup medal as Mary I won their first ever title after a 1-30 to 3-22 defeat of the University of Limerick.

Turloughmore

Linnane joined the Turloughmore club at a young age and played in all grades at juvenile and underage levels, enjoying championship success in the minor grade in 2013. He later joined the club's senior team.

Galway

Minor and under-21

Linnane first played for Galway as a member of the minor hurling team on 28 July 2013. He made his first appearance in a 1-19 to 0-13 All-Ireland quarter-final defeat of Laois. On 8 September 2013, Linnane was at right wing-back in Galway's 1-21 to 0-16 defeat by Waterford in the All-Ireland final at Croke Park.

Linnane's second and final season with the Galway minor team ended with a 1-27 to 2-09 All-Ireland semi-final defeat by Limerick on 17 August 2014.

On 20 August 2016, Linnane made his first appearance for the Galway under-21 team in a 0-21 to 0-19 All-Ireland semi-final defeat of Dublin. In the subsequent All-Ireland final on 10 September 2016, he scored two points in a  5-15 to 0-14 defeat by Waterford.

Senior

Linnane was one of eight new players drafted onto the Galway senior hurling panel prior to the start of the 2018 National League. He made his senior debut at wing-forward in a 2-18 to 0-17 National Hurling League defeat of Laois on 3 February 2018. Later that season Linnane made his first appearance in the Leinster Championship, replacing John Hanbury for the final two minutes of a 1-23 to 0-17 defeat of Wexford at Innovate Wexford Park. On 8 July 2018, he was an unused substitute in Galway's 1-28 to 3-15 Leinster final replay defeat of Kilkenny at Semple Stadium. In the subsequent All-Ireland final against Limerick on 19 August, Linnane was an unused substitute when Galway were beaten by 3-16 to 2-18.

Career statistics

Honours

Mary Immaculate College
Fitzgibbon Cup (1): 2016

Turloughmore
Galway Minor Hurling Championship (1): 2013

Galway
National Hurling League (1): 2021
Leinster Senior Hurling Championship (1): 2018

References

1996 births
Living people
Turloughmore hurlers
Galway inter-county hurlers